An election to Kildare County Council took place on 20 June 1985 as part of that year's Irish local elections. 25 councillors were elected from five electoral divisions by PR-STV voting for a six-year term of office.

Results by party

Results by Electoral Area

Athy

Celbridge

Clane

Kildare

Naas

External links

 Official website
 irishelectionliterature

1985 Irish local elections
1985